Talbot Pepys (1583 – 1 March 1666) was an English politician who sat in the House of Commons  in 1625.

Pepys was the youngest son of John Pepys of Cottenham, Cambridgeshire and his wife Edith Talbot. He was baptised at Impington on 2 April 1583.  His mother died five months after his birth. He inherited the site of his father's mansion at Impington when he was just six years old in 1589.
 
Pepys matriculated from King's College, Cambridge in 1595 and became a scholar of Trinity Hall, Cambridge in 1601.  He was admitted at Middle Temple on 13 May 1605 and was called to the bar in 1613. In 1624 he was appointed Recorder of Cambridge.

In 1625, Pepys was elected Member of Parliament for Cambridge. He was Reader of Middle Temple in 1631 and Treasurer in 1640. Pepys was often visited by his great nephew Samuel Pepys the diarist and was considered a very wise man.

Pepys died at the age of 82 at Impington and was buried in Impington Church on 5 March 1666. 

Pepys married firstly, Beatrice Castell, daughter of John Castell of Raveningham, Norfolk on 3 August 1617. They had five children.  After Beatrice's death he married secondly Paulina, who died in 1626 and was buried at St Peter's Church in Cambridge. He married his third wife Mary Tesmond not long after Paulina's death. His last wife was Mary Barker. His son Roger followed him as recorder of Cambridge and was also MP for the constituency.

References

1583 births
1666 deaths
English MPs 1625
Alumni of King's College, Cambridge
Members of the Middle Temple
English lawyers
Talbot